Ecacanthothrips is a genus of thrips in the family Phlaeothripidae.

Species
 Ecacanthothrips andrei
 Ecacanthothrips claricornis
 Ecacanthothrips coniger
 Ecacanthothrips inarmatus
 Ecacanthothrips kolibaci
 Ecacanthothrips leai
 Ecacanthothrips moundi
 Ecacanthothrips nigellus
 Ecacanthothrips spinipes
 Ecacanthothrips tenuicornis
 Ecacanthothrips tibialis

References

Phlaeothripidae
Thrips
Thrips genera